Multitasking may refer to:

 Computer multitasking, the concurrent execution of multiple tasks (also known as processes) over a certain period of time
 Cooperative multitasking
 Pre-emptive multitasking
 Human multitasking, the apparent performance by an individual of handling more than one task at the same time
 Media multitasking, using TV, the Web, radio, telephone, print, or any other media in conjunction with another